Birthright is a 1924 silent film by American director Oscar Micheaux. Produced in 10 reels, it is adapted from Thomas Sigismund Stribling's novel of the same title (1922). The film is now lost.

The cast included J. Homer Tutt (as Peter Siner), Evelyn Preer (as Cissie Deldine), Salem Tutt Whitney (as Tump Pack), Lawrence Chenault, and W. B. F. Crowell. The film explores experiences of a young African-American man who returns to a small Tennessee town after getting a college degree. Of mixed-race (called mulatto in the book), he struggles against the systemic racial discrimination of his society around the First World War.

Micheaux later rewrote the adaptation, and co-produced and directed a new 35 mm version of Birthright as a talkie, in 1938. It had a new cast. He filmed it in New Jersey.

Cast
 J. Homer Tutt as Peter Siner
 Evelyn Preer as Cissie Deldine
 Salem Tutt Whitney as Tump Pack
 Lawrence Chenault

References

External links

1924 films
Films directed by Oscar Micheaux
American silent feature films
American black-and-white films
Race films
1924 drama films
1920s American films